Vink, Dutch for chaffinch, is a Dutch surname. It usually is a metonymic occupational surname, referring to one who catches chaffinches (and other small birds) in a vinkenbaan, for food or entertainment. Variants of the name are De Vink and Vinck. The forms Vinke and Vinken could be of patronymic origin, as Vink/Finke was a masculine given name. People with this name include:

 Elsbeth van Rooy-Vink (born 1973), Dutch mountain biker
 Gery Vink (born 1965), Dutch football coach
  (1915–2009), Dutch physicist
 Named after him: the Kröger–Vink notation for electric charge and lattice
  (born 1948), Belgian photographer
 Kevin Vink (born 1984), Dutch football striker
 Marciano Vink (born 1970), Dutch football midfielder
 Michael Vink (born 1991), New Zealand racing cyclist
 Pieter Vink (born 1967), Dutch football referee
 Rachelle Vink (born 1991), Canadian curler
 Ronald Vink (born 1976), Dutch wheelchair tennis player
 Willem Vink (born 1931), Dutch botanist
 Wimilio Vink (born 1993), Dutch football midfielder

See also
 Blinde vink, a Dutch veal dish
 De Vink, a railway station in Leiden near the former hamlet of De Vink
 , a hamlet in Dutch Limburg
 , a neighborhood of Kerkrade, Dutch Limburg

References

Dutch-language surnames
German-language surnames
Occupational surnames